Chris Martin (born 24 January 1981) is a  British superbike rider who is currently competing in the British Superbike Championship for the Gearlink Kawasaki team. Martin is a previous British Superbike Privateers Cup Champion in 2006.

Career

Starting Out
Martin started out doing the 125cc Aprilia challenge, spending 3 years between 1997-99. Martin then spent 3 years in the British 125cc Championship from 2000 to 2003.

British Superbike Championship 2004-07
Martin then moved from the 125cc machines into the Superbike class, Martin rode a Privateer machine throughout his time in BSB, he finished 6th and 2nd in the championship in the first two years, but Martin moved to PR Branson Honda, and became the privateer champion of 2006. Martin switched to Red Viper Racing for BSB for 2007 without much success.

British Supersport Championship 2008-09
Martin moved down to the supersport class for 2008 joining the gearlink Kawasaki team, finishing in 6th on 99 points. Martin continued with the Gearlink Kawasaki team for the 2009 season. The 2009 season was a struggle for Martin only finishing 2 of the 9 races. Despite this Martin claimed his first win in the British Supersport class at Mallory Park, that he completed crashing heavily at Brands Hatch.

Career stats
* Correct as of 19 July 2010

British Supersport Championship

References

External links
Profile
BSB Profile

1981 births
Living people
Sportspeople from Beverley
British Supersport Championship riders
British Superbike Championship riders